Kristopher Michael Lythgoe (born 10 May 1979) is an English–American television and theatre writer/producer known for creating and producing reality television shows such as Who Are You? and So You Think You Can Dance. Lythgoe has also created several American pantomimes live stage productions based upon fairy-tales and folk tales with a modern twist.

Theatre career 
Lythgoe has written several pantomimes based upon fairy tales and folk tales. He has also produced several musicals in the United Kingdom, including Footloose and The Wedding Singer.

Pantomime
A Cinderella Christmas (2010, 2011)  
A Snow White Christmas (2012)
Aladdin and his Winter Wish (2013)
Sleeping Beauty and her Winter Knight (2014)

Filmography

As producer

Corkscrewed: The Wrath of Grapes (2006)
So You Think You Can Dance (2008 - 2009, 11 episodes)
So You Think You Can Dance Canada (2008, premiere episode only)
Who Are You? (2009)
Opening Night (2012, also as writer)
My Beautiful Game (2013, also as writer)

Awards and honors 
 Great American Award, The All-American Boys Chorus, 2018

References

External links 
 
 

British television producers
Living people
1979 births
American television producers
Lythgoe family